Golfech is a former railway station in Golfech, Occitanie, France. The station is on the Bordeaux–Sète railway. The station was served by TER (local) services operated by SNCF, between Agen and Toulouse. Train service was suspended in 2017.

References

Defunct railway stations in Tarn-et-Garonne